The 1993 Major League Baseball postseason was the playoff tournament of Major League Baseball for the 1993 season. The winners of each division advance to the postseason and face each other in a League Championship Series to determine the pennant winners that face each other in the World Series. This was the last edition of the postseason to feature only two rounds, with only division champions qualifying. After the 1994-95 Major League Baseball strike, the playoffs were expanded to include a wild card team and a new League Division Series for the 1995 postseason.

The Toronto Blue Jays and Atlanta Braves both returned to the postseason for the third year in a row, while the Chicago White Sox and Philadelphia Phillies returned for the first time in a decade. This would be the last appearance for the Phillies until 2007, as well as Toronto's last appearance until 2015.

This was the last edition of the postseason until 2008 to not feature the New York Yankees, who would make thirteen straight postseason appearances from 1995 to 2007.

The playoffs began on October 5, 1993, and concluded on October 23, 1993, with the Blue Jays defeating the Phillies in six games in the 1993 World Series. The Blue Jays repeated as World Series champions, becoming the seventh franchise in MLB history to win back-to-back championships.

Playoff seeds
The following teams qualified for the postseason:

American League
 Toronto Blue Jays - 95–67, Clinched AL East
 Chicago White Sox - 94–68, Clinched AL West

National League
 Philadelphia Phillies - 97–65, Clinched NL East
 Atlanta Braves - 104–58, Clinched NL West

Playoff bracket

American League Championship Series

Chicago White Sox vs. Toronto Blue Jays

The Blue Jays defeated the White Sox in six games to return to the World Series for the second year in a row.

The Blue Jays stole Game 1 on the road with a 7-3 victory. In Game 2, Dave Stewart out-dueled Chicago's Alex Fernandez as the Jays won 3-1 to take a 2-0 series lead headed back home to Toronto. However, things didn't go quite the Jays' way just yet. Wilson Álvarez pitched a complete game for the White Sox in Game 3 as they won 6-1 to get on the board. Game 4 was an offensive duel which was won by the White Sox, 7-4, evening the series at two. The Blue Jays would take Game 5 and the series lead back despite closer Duane Ward giving up a two-run home run to Robin Ventura in the top of the ninth. Stewart out-dueled Fernandez again in Game 6, and Ward helped seal a 6-2 Blue Jays victory to clinch the pennant.

This series was most notable for a famous non-baseball related event involving Chicago Bulls' superstar Michael Jordan. The game’s first pitch was thrown by Jordan, who recently had won his third consecutive NBA championship with the Bulls. After he threw out the first pitch, Jordan headed to the private box of White Sox and Bulls owner Jerry Reinsdorf. Jordan told Reinsdorf that he was going to retire from the NBA. The information somehow got leaked from the box and the gathered press corps received word. CBS’ Pat O’Brien, who was hosting the pregame festivities for the network, interrupted the network’s broadcast to relay the information to the national audience watching at home while several dozen reporters converged on Reinsdorf’s box looking for a confirmation. Jordan left the stadium shortly thereafter without speaking to reporters; the next morning, at a nationally televised press conference, Jordan confirmed the story.

This would be the last postseason appearance for the White Sox until 2000, where they fell to the Seattle Mariners in the ALDS. This was the last time the White Sox appeared in the ALCS until 2005, where they defeated the Los Angeles Angels of Anaheim in five games en route to winning the World Series.

As of 2022, this is the last time the Blue Jays won the AL pennant. They would return to the ALCS in 2015 and 2016, but they would lose both to the Kansas City Royals and Cleveland Indians respectively.

National League Championship Series

Philadelphia Phillies vs. Atlanta Braves

This was the first postseason meeting between the Braves and Phillies. It was also the third straight postseason series in which the Braves faced a team from Pennsylvania. The Phillies shocked the 104-win Braves in the NLCS to return to the World Series for the first time since 1983. 

In Game 1, the Phillies prevailed in extra innings, 4-3, as Kim Batiste drove in the winning run with an RBI double. Greg Maddux pitched seven solid innings as the Braves blew out the Phillies in Game 2 to even the series headed to Atlanta. In Game 3, the Braves convincingly took the series lead with a 9-4 win. In Game 4, the Phillies evened the series as Danny Jackson out-dueled John Smoltz. Game 5 was another extra-inning contest that was won by the Phillies, as Lenny Dykstra hit a solo home run in the top of the tenth put the Phillies ahead for good, taking a 3-2 series lead headed back to Philadelphia. The Phillies chased Maddux from the mound in a 6-3 victory in Game 6 to clinch the pennant.

This would be the last time the Phillies won the NL pennant until 2008, where they defeated the Los Angeles Dodgers in five games en route to a World Series title. The Braves would return to the NLCS in 1995, where they swept the Cincinnati Reds en route to winning the World Series.

Both teams would meet again in the NLDS in 2022, which was also won by the Phillies.

1993 World Series

Toronto Blue Jays (AL) vs. Philadelphia Phillies (NL) 

The Blue Jays defeated the Phillies in six games to repeat as World Series champions. 

Game 1 was an offensive duel which the Blue Jays won 8-5. In Game 2, the Phillies won 6-4 as closer Mitch Williams helped fend off a late rally by the Jays. In Philadelphia, the series then went upside down for the hometown team. Pat Hentgen pitched six solid innings as the Blue Jays blew out the Phillies in Game 3, 10-3, to take the series lead. Game 4 was a massive back-and-forth slugfest between both teams, but the Blue Jays narrowly prevailed, 15-14, to take a 3-1 series lead. Game 4 had three new World Series records set, including the longest game (4:14), most total runs scored in a single game (29), and most runs scored by a losing team (14). Curt Schilling pitched a complete game shutout for the Phillies in Game 5 as they won 2-0 to send the series back to Toronto. The Blue Jays would capture the title in the bottom of the ninth inning of Game 6 thanks to Joe Carter's walk-off 3-run home run. The Blue Jays became the seventh franchise in MLB history to repeat as World Series champions. 

After this World Series, this would be the last postseason appearance for both the Blue Jays and Phillies for a while - the Phillies did not return until 2007, while the Blue Jays waited until 2015 for their next appearance. The 1993 World Series was the last postseason series ever played at Veterans Stadium.

Along with the Montreal Canadiens winning the 1993 Stanley Cup Finals, 1993 became the first (and to date, only) year in which at least two championships of the four major North American sports leagues were won by Canadian teams. This would be the last championship of the four major North American sports leagues won by a team from Canada until the Toronto Raptors won the 2019 NBA Finals.

The Phillies would not return to the World Series until 2008, where they defeated the Tampa Bay Rays in five games to end their championship drought.

References

External links
 League Baseball Standings & Expanded Standings - 1993

 
Major League Baseball postseason